Roosevelt High School  is a four-year public high school located in Roosevelt as part of the Roosevelt School District, serving students in grades 9 through 12. It is located in the hamlet of Roosevelt in the Town of Hempstead, in Nassau County, on Long Island, in New York, United States.

As of the 2014–15 school year, the school had an enrollment of 964 students and 56.6 classroom teachers (on an FTE basis), for a student–teacher ratio of 17.0:1. There were 247 students (25.6% of enrollment) eligible for free lunch and 46 (4.8% of students) eligible for reduced-cost lunch.

Academics
Roosevelt High School has a grading and promotion policy. In order for a student to be admitted to the ninth grade, a student must pass 3 of the 4 major subject areas each year: 
 English
 Mathematics
 Science
 Social Studies
The student can fail no more than the equivalent of 1 credit in minor subjects each year (i.e. Technology 1/2 credit, Home Economics 1/2 credit, etc.)

To be promoted from grade 9 to 10, a student must earn 4 units of credit.

These units must include: 1 in English and 1 in Social Studies. To be promoted from grade 10 to grade 11, a student must have earned 9 units of credit. These units must include: 2 units in English, 2 units in Social Studies, 1 unit in Mathematics, 1 unit in Science. A student must receive a minimum grade of 70 in order to advance.

Demographics
As of the 2018-19 school year, the student body of Roosevelt High School consisted of:
 0 American Indian or Alaska Native students (0% of the student body)
 396 Black or African American students (40% of the student body)
 592 Hispanic or Latino students (60% of the student body)
 2 Asian or Native Hawaiian/Other Pacific Islander students (.05% of the student body)
 1 White students (.01% of the student body)
 0 Multiracial students (0% of the student body)

Notable alumni
Notable Roosevelt Junior-Senior High School alumni include:
 Eddie Murphy, comedian and actor.
 Julius Erving, otherwise known as "Dr. J", member of the Basketball Hall of Fame who played for the Philadelphia 76ers until his retirement.
 Howard Stern, radio personality.
 Gabriel Casseus, Actor (New Jersey Drive, Fallen, Their Eyes Were Watching God), writer and producer (Takers).

References

External links
 Great Schools Web site information on Roosevelt High School

Public high schools in New York (state)
Schools in Nassau County, New York
Educational institutions established in 1956
1956 establishments in New York (state)